Jake and the Never Land Pirates (titled Captain Jake and the Never Land Pirates for the fourth season and associated merchandise) is an American animated musical and interactive preschool children's television series shown on Disney Junior. Based on Disney's Peter Pan franchise (itself based on the famous 1904 play and 1911 book by British author J. M. Barrie), this was the first Disney Junior original show following the switch from Playhouse Disney. It stars Sean Ryan Fox, Megan Richie, Jadon Sand, Kirsten Newlands, David Arquette, Corey Burton, Jeff Bennett, Loren Hoskins and Dee Bradley Baker. The title character Jake was previously voiced by Colin Ford, and then later by Cameron Boyce, while Izzy was voiced for the first three seasons by Madison Pettis and Kirsten Newlands and Cubby was voiced by Jonathan Morgan Heit. The series was created by Disney veteran Bobs Gannaway, whose works include another Disney Junior series, Mickey Mouse Clubhouse, and films such as Secret of the Wings, The Pirate Fairy, and Planes: Fire & Rescue.

The series focuses on a band of young pirates consisting of Jake, Izzy, Cubby, and their parrot Skully, who continuously spend their days competing against Captain Hook and his pirate crew (consisting of Mr. Smee, Sharky and Bones) for treasure. But Jake and his crew beat Hook and his crew, and throw them to the sea. Captain Hook and his crew gets chased away by Hook's fear nemesis, Tick-Tock the Crocodile and Jake and his crew wins for treasure. They are often accompanied by several characters including their living pirate ship, Bucky, and their mermaid friend, Marina.

The series started its fourth and final season on September 14, 2015, which is titled Captain Jake and the Never Land Pirates. The show ran until November 6, 2016.

Premise

The show takes place some time after the events of the original 1953 Peter Pan film, focusing on three kid pirates, Jake, Izzy, and Cubby. Each episode consists of two eleven-minute animated segments where Jake and his crew adventure around Never Land, having fun, singing songs, learning lessons, and outsmarting Captain Hook and his crew. Throughout the segments, the characters will earn gold doubloons each time they solve a problem together, and at the end of the segment, Jake and his crew count their gold doubloons and put them in their "Team Treasure Chest".

The first season of the series followed more "playful" conflicts, such as Jake and the crew getting their basketball back from Captain Hook, or Captain Jake and the crew taking back their stolen skateboard. The second season had less interactive moments and gave a larger scale to the plot and adventure in the show, now having the characters find a lost city of gold and an ancient pirate pyramid. The third season had an updated theme song and contained more action. The fourth and final season has one fourth-wall break at the end of each episode.

Almost every episode contains two eleven-minute animated segments, followed by a live-action song by the Never Land Pirate Band. The singing characters Sharky and Bones appear in both animated and live action forms, being part of Hook's crew.

Episodes

Characters

Main
 Jake (voiced by Colin Ford, season 1-"Little Red Riding Hook"; Cameron Boyce, "Izzy  Trident Treasure"-"Queen Izzy-Bella"; Sean Ryan Fox, "Smee–erella"-"The Great Never Sea Conquest"; Riley Thomas Stewart, season 4) is the protagonist of the series and leader of the Never Land Pirates. He is Captain Hook's main pirate rival. One of his catchphrases is "Yo ho, let's go!", and he is shown using a telescope and steering the ship in the opening. He wears a red bandanna and later covers it with a blue captain's hat. He consistently wears brown boots with a capital J and white shirts. He wears blue jeans and later black pants. He had a wooden sword called the Forever Sword (cut from the Forever Tree), which was given to him by Peter Pan. He has also briefly used a transformable Mega-Mecha Sword and golden Destiny Sword. As a captain he later uses a metal one called the Mighty Captain's Sword. It is able to cut through metal padlocks, heat up to cut through ice bars, shoot heat beams, and deflect cold or energy blasts. Both cutlasses have a crossguard on the hilt, but his newer metal sword has a larger pommel and no knuckle-bow on the side. Jake also acquires an invisibility ring, and has used Izzy's pixie dust to fly. His parents are never seen or mentioned. 
 Izzy (voiced by Madison Pettis, season 1–"Happy 1,000th Birthday!"; Megan Richie, "Shiverjack"-season 4) acts as second-in-command to Jake. She has a small sack of pixie dust, which was given to her at an unknown point by the fairies (Tinker Bell and her friends). The team uses the pixie dust only for emergencies. However, there had been episodes when pixie dust is not used at all especially in "No Returns". Her catchphrase is "Yay, hey, no way!" 
 Cubby (voiced by Jonathan Morgan Heit, season 1–"Stowaway Ghost"; Jadon Sand; "Battle for the Book"-season 4)  is the youngest of the group with his catchphrase, "Aww, coconuts!" He has the map of Never Land and is shown manning the crow's nest in the opening. Cubby is not a member of the "Lost Boys", despite the fact he physically resembles the Cubby of the group. Cubby's personality is rather timid and he is not very confident in himself. Sometimes, he can be clumsy, and is Jake's best friend.
 Skully (speaking voice by David Arquette and singing voice provided by Loren Hoskins) is a small, green talking anthropomorphic parrot who acts like a guardian to the team. He is usually shown wearing a black bandanna with white skulls on it. He keeps a lookout for Captain Hook and Mr. Smee.
 Bucky is Jake, Izzy, Cubby and Skully's pirate ship. It is known to have some life in it, listening to the orders given by Jake and his crew. Bucky can move parts of itself, including stairs, a slide, a bell, its sails, its steering mechanisms, and more, and can also fly.
 Captain Hook (voiced by Corey Burton) is Never Land's resident pirate captain and Peter Pan's nemesis. Hook is commander of the galleon "The Jolly Roger". Legendary for his cruelty to his enemies as well as his own men, Captain Hook has trouble holding onto a permanent crew. In fact, at the moment, he only has three crew members, the rest of his crew was never seen or appeared in the show. He also likes to keep a collection of different things; such as seashells. His biggest fear is encountering Tick Tock, who is the same crocodile that ate Captain Hook's hand when Peter Pan sliced it off. 
 Mr. Smee (voiced by Jeff Bennett) is Captain Hook's first mate. He is also an expert on Never Land's legends. He is known for delivering most of the show's comedy. He is also the wisest of all the pirates in Captain Hook's team, but no one ever seems to listen to his suggestions.
 Sharky (voiced by Loren Hoskins) and Bones (voiced by Jeff Bennett; and singing voices provided by Kevin Hendrickson) are members of Captain Hook's pirate crew. They usually spend time performing musical numbers rather than advancing the plot, acting as troubadours. Live action versions appear at the end of the show and they perform an original song.
 The Jolly Roger is Captain Hook and his crew's ship. It is bigger than Bucky, but doesn't have any life like Bucky.

Recurring
 Marina (voiced by Ariel Winter) is a young mermaid who lives in the ocean around Never Land with the rest of her people. Unlike some of the mermaids, who tend to be snobbish, selfish, vain and downright cruel, Marina is sweet, gentle and kind to the young pirates. She often shows them the secrets of the Never Sea she finds. Marina and Izzy are very close friends, and may even be the same age. Marina also has a little sister named Stormy, and has a crush on Jake.
 Tick-Tock (voiced by Dee Bradley Baker) is the very same crocodile that devoured Captain Hook's left hand after Peter Pan cuts it off in a sword fight some years ago. Tick-Tock loved the taste of Captain Hook's hand so well that he has followed the Jolly Roger ever since, licking his chops as he imagines the rest of his meal. And he also swallowed an alarm clock that goes tick-tock to warn Captain Hook.
 Never Bird (vocal effects provided by Russi Taylor) is a former sidekick of Captain Hook whom she soon betrays and joins forces with Jake and his crew.
 Sandy (voiced by Loren Hoskins) is Marina's singing pet starfish with the ability to heal with a special song.
 The Pirate Princess (speaking voice by Tori Spelling and singing voice provided by Laura Dickinson) is a legendary pirate who was cursed and shipwrecked in a hidden grotto but was later rescued by Jake and his crew.
 Winger (voiced by Lisa Loeb) is Skully's close friend who reveals to be the princess of the Sky Bird Kingdom.
 The Wise Old Parrot (voiced by Adam West) is an aged scarlet macaw and ruler of the Sky Bird Kingdom.
 Mama Hook (voiced by Sharon Osbourne) is Captain Hook's mother.
 Red Jessica (voiced by Jane Kaczmarek) is a swashbuckling pirate with whom Captain Hook falls in love.
 Captain Flynn (voiced by Josh Duhamel) is a pirate who became stranded on the Never Land desert with his ship The Barracuda but rescued by Jake and the Never Land pirates.
 Peter Pan (voiced by Adam Wylie) is Captain Hook's nemesis and the leader of Never Land (specifically the "Lost Boys", who never appeared in the show). He has been mentioned numerous times throughout the series, and made an appearance in the special episodes "Peter Pan Returns", "Jake Saves Bucky", "Never Land Rescue", and "Battle for the Book".
 Stormy (voiced by Allisyn Ashley Arm) is Marina's lazy, yet, well-meaning younger sister. She may or may not have feelings for Cubby.
 The Sea Witch (voiced by Carol Kane) is an evil witch who wants to turn the Pirate Princess into gold, but when Izzy stops her, she later turns into a good witch.
 Misty (speaking voice by Tiffani Thiessen and singing voice provided by Laura Dickinson) is a good witch who tends to be the Pirate Princess' neighbor.
 Pip (voiced by Jerry O'Connell) is a pirate genie who used to reside in a ship-in-the-bottle.
 Percy (voiced by Rhys Darby) is a small anthropomorphic penguin who Jake and his crew help to get his group to their colony. 
 Beatrice Le Beak (voiced by Teri Hatcher) is a sneaky pirate who steals things from Captain Hook.
 Queen Coralie (voiced by Leigh-Allyn Baker) is the Mermaid ruler of Neptune City.
 Pirate Mummy (voiced by Jack McBrayer) is a thousand-year-old pirate mummy who inhabits the Pirate Mummy's Tomb in the Never Land Desert.
 Ghostly Bob (voiced by Bill Farmer) is the leader of a mischievous band of pirate ghosts who were sealed away in the wooden crate and cast into the bottom of the Never Sea.
 Wendy Darling (voiced by Maia Mitchell) is the eldest of the Darling siblings and one of Peter Pan and Tinker Bell's oldest and dearest friends. She appears in "Battle for the Book".
 John Darling (voiced by Elliot Reeve) is the middle child of the Darling siblings. He appears in "Battle for the Book".
 Michael Darling (voiced by Colby Mulgrew) is the brother of Wendy and John Darling. He appears in "Battle for the Book".
 Peg-Leg Peg (voiced by Estelle Harris) is a pirate ghost and Captain Treasure Tooth love interest. She appears in "Pirate Ghost Story".
 Dread (voiced by David Tennant) is an evil genie who steals other genies' magic for himself.
 Lord Fathom (voiced by Malcolm McDowell) is an evil Merwizard who plots to take over the Never Sea.
 ShiverJack (voiced by Mark Hamill) is a villainous sorcerer with ice-themed powers.
 Doctor Undergear (voiced by Tony Hale) is a mad inventor.
 The Grim Buccaneer (voiced by Christian Slater) is a shadowy and swift pirate.

Music
The show's musical elements are handled by Loren Hoskins and Kevin Hendrickson, who were emailed by the show's creator Bobs Gannaway, asking if they would be interested in creating songs for the show. According to Hoskins, Gannaway "just wanted good music to listen to while he was writing the pilot". Gannaway searched "pirate music for kids" online and found his way to Captain Bogg and Salty, listening to their songs while working on the script. He introduced the band to Jay Stutler, vice president of music at Disney Television Animation. "We're in charge of creating every note of music for the show. We create the underscore. We sit in the studio and record the background music that comes in and out." The music for the show has been praised for being enjoyable for both the children, and the adult caretakers. Three soundtracks have been released featuring songs from the show.

Broadcast
The series aired worldwide on Disney Junior. It premiered on May 6, 2011 in Canada, on May 7, 2011 in the United Kingdom and Ireland, on May 29, 2011 in Australia and New Zealand, on June 1, 2011 in South Africa, on July 4, 2011 in India, on July 11, 2011 in Southeast Asia, and on April 29, 2013 in Zimbabwe, with TVNZ in New Zealand and 7flix in Australia.

Home media

Reception

Critical
The series has received generally mixed reviews. A review in Variety called it "part video game, part interactive cartoon, part advertisement for 'Peter Pan' merchandise". The Los Angeles Times gave a mixed review of the show's portrayal of Captain Hook compared to the classic Peter Pan, stating that the character "has been laundered — reasonably enough, yet sadly as well — into a shell of his former self, too silly to be frightening, not even a decent bully, just a kind of (much) older boy who wants to steal your toys." Common Sense Media rated it "on" for ages 3 and older, praising the educational content, role models, and especially the messages of the show, and expressing only mild concern about the moderate violence.  As the flagship of the newly launched Disney Junior channel, the series was rated the most-watched program among boys ages 2–5 during its first few weeks on the air, with 2.9 million viewers, including 1.1 million ages 2–5, and over 600,000 women ages 18–49 (presumed to be mothers and other caregivers). On July 27, the series was awarded #2 of the Best TV Shows 2011 list.

The character Jake has too received positive reviews. The character has been thought of as a "classic Disney character", lovable and entertaining addition. He has quickly become an icon at Disney's Hollywood Studios from the popular Disney Junior Live as well as being added on the park's entrance drawings. The atmosphere character can be seen at the Hollywood And Vine character breakfast and the Animation courtyard, while at Disney California Adventure, Jake can be found on Hollywood Boulevard in Hollywood Land.

Awards and nominations

Merchandise
Upon the initial release of the series onwards, there has been a high demand for toys, games, and other merchandise from the show. At the American International Toy Fair in New York City, Disney announced a line of toys to be released in the summer of 2012.

Video games
On May 24, 2012, the Jake's Never Land Pirate School app was released on  Apple and Android devices.

A variety of other video games are based on the series including:
Big Air Adventure a 5-series crossover of title characters from Doc McStuffins, Henry Hugglemonster, Miles from Tomorrowland, and Sofia the First
Bucky's Never Sea Hunt
Cave of Mystery
Go Bananas
Golden Pirate Pumpkin Patch
Hook Yer Pirate Name
Hook's Merry Winter Treasure Hunt
Izzy's Flying Adventure
Jake and the Never Land Pirates Sand Pirates
Never Land Games
Shadow Shenanigans
Sharky and Bones Pirate Rock
Super Pirate Powers
The Great Pirate Pyramid
Rainbow Wand Color Quest
Jake's Story Quest

Spin-offs
On July 27, 2012, Disney announced a spin-off series of shorts of the show centering Skully. The series is titled Playing With Skully, and is a collection of short cartoons that aired on September 19, 2012. Another short series entitled Jake's Never Land Pirate School premiered on November 26, 2012. The third spin-off, Mama Hook Knows Best! premiered on September 29, 2013, starring Sharon Osbourne as Mama Hook, but instead of a series, it was a book. The fourth spin-off entitled, Jake's Buccaneer Blast premiered on October 26, 2014, as the first Lego Duplo adventure.

See also
Never Land Pirate Band
Tree Fu Tom

Notes

References

External links
 
 
 
 Disney Channel information on Jake and the Never Land Pirates

2011 American television series debuts
2016 American television series endings
Disney Junior original programming
American children's animated adventure television series
American children's animated fantasy television series
American children's animated musical television series
2010s American animated television series
American preschool education television series
Animated preschool education television series
Witchcraft in television
2010s preschool education television series
English-language television shows
American flash animated television series
Television series by Disney Television Animation
Peter Pan television series
Peter Pan (franchise)
Television series based on Disney films
Television series based on adaptations
American sequel television series
American television series with live action and animation
Animated television series about birds
Animated television series about children
Television series about pirates
Television series set in fictional countries
Annie Award winners